Gongyang of Goryeo (9 March 1345 – 17 May 1394) was the 34th and final ruler of the Goryeo Dynasty of Korea. He was the descendant of Duke Yangyang, brother of King Huijong. He was deposed by Yi Seong-gye, who then established the new Joseon Dynasty.

Biography

Background and early life
He was born as the second and youngest son of Wang Gyun, 6th-generation descendant of King Sinjong from his youngest son, Duke Yangyang. His mother was Princess Boknyeong, a great-granddaughter of King Chungnyeol. He had an older brother, Wang U, Prince Jeongyang. Due to this, the future King had the Goryeo royal family's bloods from both of paternal and maternal line. 

At a young age, he was honoured as Prince Jeongchang (정창군, 定昌君) and then married the daughter of No Chaek, Internal Prince Changseong from the Gyoha No clan. His niece, Lady Kang, married Yi Seong-gye as his second wife.

Reign
Although he did everything to prove that he had no political ambitions, Yi Seong-gye's faction used him as a bloodless propaganda tool. In 1389, Yi's supporters forced King Chang from the throne and enthroned King Gongyang in his stead. This faction went on to oversee the events of King Gongyang's brief reign, including the assassinations of King U and King Chang. After the murder of Jeong Mong-ju, the last major supporter of the Goryeo kings, King Gongyang was deposed in 1392 by Yi Seong-gye, his son (Yi Bang-won), Jeong Do-jeon and others, which brought the Goryeo dynasty to an end.

Life after deposition
The former king was initially exiled to Wonju and granted the title of Prince Gongyang (공양군, 恭讓君), but was later moved to Samcheok, where he was assassinated in 1394 alongside his son, Crown Prince Wang Seok in Gungchon. In 1416, King Taejong honored him as King Gongyang (공양왕, 恭讓王) and sent an envoy to inspect his tomb.

Family
Parents
Father: Wang Gyun, Internal Prince Jeongwon (정원부원군 왕균)
Grandfather: Wang Yu, Marquess Sunhwa (순화후 왕유; d.1360)
Grandmother: Consort Myeongye of the Mahan State, of the Shin clan (마한국명예비 신씨)
Mother: Grand Consort Wang of Samhan State  (삼한국대비 왕씨)
Grandfather: Wang Hun, Grand Prince Yeondeok (연덕부원대군 왕훈 )
Grandmother: Consort Ahn, of the Jo clan (안의비 조씨)
Consorts and their respective issue(s): 
Royal Consort Sun of the Gyoha No clan (순비 노씨; d. 1394)
Crown Prince Wang Seok (세자 왕석; d. 1394)
Princess Suknyeong (숙녕궁주)
Princess Jeongsin (정신궁주)
Princess Gyeonghwa (경화궁주)
Prince Wang (왕자 왕씨; d. 1394?)
Prince Wang An (왕자 왕안;d.1416)

Ancestry

In popular culture
Portrayed by Kim Jin-hae in the 1983 KBS TV series Foundation of the Kingdom.
Portrayed by Kim Woong-chul in the 1983 MBC TV series The King of Chudong Palace.
Portrayed by Kim Young-sun in the 1996–1998 KBS TV series Tears of the Dragon.
Portrayed by Kim Byung-choon in the 2012–2013 SBS TV series The Great Seer.
Portrayed by Nam Sung-jin in the 2014 KBS TV series Jeong Do-jeon.
Portrayed by Lee Do-yup in the 2015–2016 SBS TV series Six Flying Dragons.
Portrayed by Park Hyung-joon in the 2021 KBS1 TV series The King of Tears, Lee Bang-won.

See also
List of monarchs of Korea
Goryeo

References

 

1345 births
1394 deaths
Executed Korean people
14th-century Korean monarchs
People executed by hanging
Korean Buddhist monarchs